Matthew "Mac" McClung (born January 6, 1999) is an American professional basketball player for the Philadelphia 76ers of the National Basketball Association (NBA), on a two-way contract with the Delaware Blue Coats of the NBA G League. He played college basketball for the Georgetown Hoyas and the Texas Tech Red Raiders. He was a consensus three-star recruit and among the highest-ranked high school players in Virginia.

McClung went unselected in the 2021 NBA draft and spent time during the 2021–22 season with the Chicago Bulls and Los Angeles Lakers. With the South Bay Lakers of the G League, he won the 2021–22 NBA G League Rookie of the Year award. McClung joined the Blue Coats for the 2022–23 season and signed with the 76ers in February 2023. He won the NBA Slam Dunk Contest at the 2023 NBA All-Star Game.

Early life
McClung grew up in Gate City, Virginia, a small town of about 2,000 in the Tri-Cities metropolitan area straddling the Tennessee–Virginia border, where he initially began playing football—a sport that is far more popular than basketball in Southwest Virginia. Family members recalled in a 2018 interview that McClung was extraordinarily competitive as a child. His father Marcus said of him, "Mac was just born with it. If you’re fixing a bowl of cereal, he’s going to make a competition." His older sister Anna would add, "He would just come at you every day, no matter how small he was." His parents built a basement gym in their home, initially for Anna, but Mac would regularly use it as he grew up—though he was so competitive that his father would frequently ban him from the gym to allow Anna to work out undisturbed.

He received his first significant exposure to basketball just before entering the seventh grade, when his mother Lenoir signed him up for a local youth league. Scott Vermillion, who was McClung's coach at Gate City High School, recalled in 2018, "He ducked his head inside for a minute and basically never left." McClung soon became more interested in basketball and began training for the sport regularly, with hopes of making the National Basketball Association (NBA), and his father was silently pleased when he gave up football after his freshman year of high school. According to McClung, his shooting form improved after he broke his arm while snowboarding in eighth grade, and he honed the skill with Greg Ervin, the former head coach at Gate City High.

High school career
McClung first started dunking as a sophomore playing varsity basketball at Gate City High School. He grew in profile as an acrobatic dunker through the rest of his high school career. MaxPreps labeled him "one of nation's most exciting players." As a junior, on February 24, 2017, he scored a career-high 64 points in a loss to Dan River High School at the Virginia High School League (VHSL) Region 2A West tournament. It was the best scoring performance in school history and the highest among Virginia public schools since 1984. After the season, he was averaging 29.0 points, 5.5 assists, and 3.0 steals per game for the Blue Devils and was tabbed Southwest Virginia Boys' Basketball Player of the Year by the Bristol Herald Courier. In the summer, he committed to play for Rutgers in college.

On December 12, he made his senior debut by scoring 47 points, shooting 18-of-23, in a 96–43 win over Lee High School. Among those in attendance was Georgetown head coach Patrick Ewing. On January 11, 2018, after opposing coach James Schooler reportedly told him "you're going to Georgetown to sit," McClung scored 44 points against Fern Creek High School of Louisville, Kentucky at the Arby's Classic tournament in Bristol, Tennessee. McClung broke the VHSL single-season scoring record previously held by Hall of Famer Allen Iverson during the 2018 VHSL regional playoffs on February 21, surpassing Iverson's record of 948 points in 25 games—five fewer than it took Iverson to amass the previous record. He ended his high school career with Gate City's first state championship, scoring 47 points in an 80–65 title-game win over Staunton's Robert E. Lee High. The 47 points broke a VHSL all-classes scoring record for a championship game that had been held by former NBA player JJ Redick. McClung finished the season with 1,153 points and 2,801 for his career, also a VHSL all-classes record, and was again named Southwest Virginia Player of the Year by the Herald Courier. He won the slam dunk contest at the Ballislife All-American Game.

Recruiting
Prior to his final high school season, on October 6, 2017, McClung decommitted from Rutgers. Over one week later, he committed to Georgetown.

College career

Georgetown (2018–2020)
On December 22, 2018, McClung scored a freshman season-high 38 points for Georgetown in a 102–94 victory over Little Rock. As a freshman, he averaged 13.1 points, 2.6 rebounds, and two assists per game, leading Big East Conference freshmen in scoring. McClung was named to the Big East All-Freshman Team. In February 2020, during his sophomore season, he missed several games with a foot injury. McClung only played 21 games due to the injury, averaging 15.7 points, 2.4 assists, and 1.4 steals in 27 minutes per game as a sophomore. After the season, he declared for the 2020 NBA draft and signed with an NCAA-certified agent to maintain his collegiate eligibility. On May 13, he withdrew from the draft and entered the NCAA transfer portal.

Texas Tech (2020–2021)
On May 27, 2020, McClung left Georgetown and announced that he would transfer to Texas Tech. He was granted a waiver for immediate eligibility on October 30. In his Texas Tech debut on November 25, McClung scored 20 points in a 101–58 win against Northwestern State. As a junior, he averaged 15.5 points, 2.7 rebounds, and 2.1 assists per game.

McClung entered the transfer portal again in April 2021 while simultaneously declaring for the 2021 NBA draft. In May 2021, McClung confirmed via Twitter that he would remain in the draft and forgo his remaining college eligibility.

Professional career

South Bay Lakers (2021)
After going undrafted in the 2021 NBA draft, McClung joined the Los Angeles Lakers for the 2021 NBA Summer League, and afterwards signed with the team on August 10, 2021. However, he was waived on October 13. On October 23, 2021, he signed with the South Bay Lakers of the NBA G League, the affiliate team of the Los Angeles Lakers. Mac's debut with South Bay consisted of a game-high 24 points, nine assists and six rebounds in a 112–105 victory over the NBA G League Ignite on November 5, 2021.

Chicago Bulls (2021–2022)
On December 22, 2021, McClung signed a 10-day contract with the Chicago Bulls. He signed a second 10-day contract with them on January 1, 2022. On January 4, 2022, the Chicago Bulls assigned McClung to their NBA G League affiliate, the Windy City Bulls. McClung debuted the next night, scoring 19 points and adding nine assists in a 112-108 loss to the Motor City Cruise. On January 6, 2022, McClung was recalled to the main roster.

Return to South Bay / Los Angeles Lakers (2022)
On January 11, 2022, after his 10-day contracts expired, McClung was reacquired by the South Bay Lakers. He was named the 2021–22 G League Rookie of the Year.

On April 9, 2022, McClung signed a two-way contract with the Los Angeles Lakers. On June 29, Los Angeles declined his $1.62 million qualifying offer, making him an unrestricted free agent. He joined the Lakers for the California Classic in the 2022 NBA Summer League.

After playing two games for the Lakers' summer league team, McClung joined the Golden State Warriors' summer squad. On July 22, 2022, McClung signed a one-year, non-guaranteed contract with the Warriors. On October 3, McClung was released by the Warriors.

On October 9, 2022, the Philadelphia 76ers signed McClung to an Exhibit 10 contract before waiving him a day later.

Philadelphia 76ers / Delaware Blue Coats (2022–present)
McClung joined the NBA G League's Delaware Blue Coats for the 2022–23 season. He accepted an invitation to the 2023 NBA Slam Dunk Contest and became the first G League player to participate in the event. McClung was named to the G League's inaugural Next Up Game for the 2022–23 season.

On February 14, 2023, McClung signed a two-way contract with the Philadelphia 76ers. On February 18, he won the NBA Slam Dunk Contest; 19 out of his 20 scores from the judges were a perfect 50, with a lone 49 in his second dunk of the first round.

Career statistics

NBA

Regular season

|-
| style="text-align:left;" rowspan="2 | 
| style="text-align:left;"| Chicago
| 1 || 0 || 3.0 || 1.000 ||  ||  || .0 || .0 || .0 || .0 || 2.0
|-
| style="text-align:left;"| L.A. Lakers
| 1 || 0 || 22.0 || .400 || .333 || 1.000 || 3.0 || 1.0 || 1.0 || 1.0 || 6.0
|- class="sortbottom"
| style="text-align:center;" colspan="2"| Career
| 2 || 0 || 12.5 || .500 || .333 || 1.000 || 1.5 || .5 || .5 || .5 || 4.0

College

|-
| style="text-align:left;"| 2018–19
| style="text-align:left;"| Georgetown
| 29 || 29 || 26.4 || .392 || .277 || .798 || 2.6 || 2.0 || .8 || .1 || 13.1
|-
| style="text-align:left;"| 2019–20
| style="text-align:left;"| Georgetown
| 21 || 20 || 26.8 || .394 || .323 || .802 || 3.1 || 2.4 || 1.4 || .2 || 15.7
|-
| style="text-align:left;"| 2020–21
| style="text-align:left;"| Texas Tech
| 29 || 29 || 30.2 || .419 || .343 || .793 || 2.7 || 2.1 || .8 || .3 || 15.5
|- class="sortbottom"
| style="text-align:center;" colspan="2"| Career
| 79 || 78 || 27.9 || .403 || .313 || .797 || 2.8 || 2.2 || 1.0 || .2 || 14.7

Personal life
McClung is the son of Marcus and Lenoir McClung. During his birth, his umbilical cord was tightly wrapped around his neck; his father recalled, "He was blue as a Smurf." The attending physicians quickly freed him, and he almost immediately recovered. His parents met at Virginia Tech, where Marcus played football and Lenoir was a cheerleader. His father became an attorney, serving as Commonwealth Attorney for Scott County, Virginia as of 2018, while his mother was teaching driver's education at Gate City High. According to a 2018 story in The Washington Post, as well a story in The Undefeated, his parents' background aided McClung in his athletic pursuits. His father served as trainer for much of his youth, and the family was able to afford placing him on a Richmond-based AAU travel team.

His sister Anna, who completed her high school soccer career as the VHSL's all-time goal scoring leader, played the sport at Florida State and Tennessee, and his uncle Seth competed with two Major League Baseball (MLB) teams. His aunts Correne and Collette both played Division I college hockey; Correne also played with the Canadian national team. His cousin is Houston rapper Riff Raff.

References

External links

Texas Tech Red Raiders bio
Georgetown Hoyas bio

1999 births
Living people
American men's basketball players
Basketball players from Virginia
Chicago Bulls players
Delaware Blue Coats players
Georgetown Hoyas men's basketball players
People from Gate City, Virginia
Point guards
South Bay Lakers players
Texas Tech Red Raiders basketball players
Undrafted National Basketball Association players
Windy City Bulls players
United States men's national basketball team players